Hilary Childs-Adams is the Canadian Ambassador to Libya and served as ambassador to Lebanon and as deputy head of mission at the Embassy to Germany.  She replaced David Sproule in October 2017.

She earned a BSL with Honours from Laurentian University and worked at the House of Commons until she entered public service.  At first, she worked for the deputy solicitor general before joining the Department of External Affairs as a foreign service officer.

References

Laurentian University alumni
Canadian women ambassadors
Ambassadors of Canada to Libya
Ambassadors of Canada to Lebanon
Living people
Year of birth missing (living people)